This is a list of films produced by the Ollywood film industry based in Bhubaneshwar and Cuttack in 1963:

A-Z

References

1963
Ollywood
Films, Ollywood
1960s in Orissa